Hemicube can mean:
Hemicube (technology company), a company based in Dubai that develops advanced technology solutions. 
Hemicube (computer graphics), a concept in 3D computer graphics rendering
Hemicube (geometry), an abstract regular polytope
Demihypercube, an n-dimensional uniform polytope, also known as the n-hemicube